Richard Whorf (June 4, 1906 – December 14, 1966) was an American actor, writer and film director.

Life and acting career
Whorf was born in Winthrop, Massachusetts to Harry and Sarah (née Lee) Whorf. His older brother was linguist Benjamin Lee Whorf. Whorf began his acting career on the Boston stage as a teenager, then moved to Broadway at age 21, debuting there in The Banshee (1927). He had a role in a production of Taming of the Shrew at the Globe Theatre in New York City. He moved to Hollywood and became a contract player in films of the 1930s and 1940s before becoming a director in 1944. He played a famous painter who had resorted to drinking in the 1960 episode "The Illustrator" of The Rifleman, starring Chuck Connors and Johnny Crawford.

Directing career
He began his film directing career with the 1942 short subject March On, America and the 1944 feature film Blonde Fever.

He directed a number of television programs in the 1950s and 1960s, including early episodes of Gunsmoke, the entire second season of My Three Sons and 67 episodes of The Beverly Hillbillies. He directed the short-lived series Border Patrol, and the 1964–1965 ABC sitcom Mickey, starring Mickey Rooney. In the summer of 1960, he guest-starred in one episode and directed other segments of the short-lived western series Tate.

Whorf directed the unsuccessful 1961 stage comedy Julia, Jake and Uncle Joe. His hobby was painting; he sold his first painting at the age of 15 for $100.

Personal life

In 1929, Whorf married Margaret H. Smith.

Whorf died at age 60 on December 14, 1966. His grave site is at Forest Lawn Memorial Park, in Hollywood Hills, Los Angeles.

Partial filmography

As actor

Midnight (1934) - Arthur Weldon
Blues in the Night (1941) - Jigger Pine
Yankee Doodle Dandy (1942) - Sam Harris
Juke Girl (1942) - Danny Frazier
Keeper of the Flame (1943) - Clive Kerndon
Assignment in Brittany (1943) - Jean Kerenor
The Cross of Lorraine (1943) - François
The Impostor (1944, aka Strange Confession) - Lt. Varenne
Christmas Holiday (1944) - Simon Fenimore
Blonde Fever (1944) - Chef (uncredited)
Chain Lightning (1950) - Carl Troxell
The Groom Wore Spurs (1951) - Film Director Richard Whorf (uncredited)

As director

Blonde Fever (1944)
The Hidden Eye (1945)
The Sailor Takes a Wife (1945)
Till the Clouds Roll By (1946)
It Happened in Brooklyn (1947)
Love from a Stranger (1947)
Luxury Liner (1948)
Champagne for Caesar (1950)
The Groom Wore Spurs (1951)
Gunsmoke (1958)

As producer
The Burning Hills (1956)
Shoot-Out at Medicine Bend (1957)
Bombers B-52 (1957)

References

External links

 
 
 

1906 births
1966 deaths
Male actors from Massachusetts
American male film actors
American male television actors
American television directors
Male actors from Los Angeles
People from Winthrop, Massachusetts
American costume designers
Burials at Forest Lawn Memorial Park (Hollywood Hills)
20th-century American male actors
American male stage actors